The Uruguayan Championship 1909 was the ninth official championship of Uruguayan football history.

Overview
The tournament consisted of a two-wheel championship of all against all. It involved eleven teams, and the champion was Montevideo Wanderers.

Teams

League standings 

Promoted for next season: Libertad.

References
Uruguay - List of final tables (RSSSF)

Uruguayan Primera División seasons
Uru
1